Archbishop Weber High School was a U.S. Roman Catholic all-boys' high school in northwest Chicago, Illinois. Founded in September 1890 as  St. Stanislaus College by Rev. Vincent Barzyński, it was the first Polish secondary school in Chicago. It was within the Roman Catholic Archdiocese of Chicago.

History
In the 1960s, the school had about 1,200 students. The U.S. Department of Education recognized Weber as a "National Exemplary School" in 1990. In the 1990s, the tuition fees increased and the student population declined by 100 on an annual basis until its final school year, 1998–1999, when it had 250 students and an annual tuition of $4,700 ($ when considering inflation). The school was scheduled to close in June 1999.

The heritage of Weber is kept alive through the Weber High School Alumni Association. Alumni records are held in DePaul College Prep's Records Office.

Notable alumni
 Mike Krzyzewski (born 1947), head men's basketball coach at Duke University
 Bill Skowron (born 1930, died 2012), American professional baseball first baseman. He was an eight-time All-Star and a five-time World Series champion, one of just six players in MLB history to have won back-to-back Series championships on different teams.

References

External links
 Weber High School Alumni Association

1890 establishments in Illinois
1999 disestablishments in Illinois
Defunct Catholic secondary schools in Illinois
Educational institutions established in 1890
Educational institutions disestablished in 1999
Private high schools in Chicago